Adaptive representation is an extension by Francis Heylighen to Kant's theory of knowledge.

According to Kant, perception passes by the filters of the mind who observes the phenomena. In this line, there exists in the human mind invariant and a priori principles of experience. As an example, one may have imprinted in the brain a Cartesian representation of space, a notion of time, color separation and others. This may be called "static representation".

Heylighen has proposed a revision of these Kantian ideas, in which these principles are not supposed to be invariant and necessary. Instead, alternative principles exist for the organization of experience in adaptive representations. This opens a path for new investigations in the philosophy of mind and human cognition.

References

External links
Web edition of "Representation and Change" (1999).

Epistemology
Theories